Lionel Blue  (6 February 1930 – 19 December 2016) was a British Reform rabbi, journalist and broadcaster, described by The Guardian as "one of the most respected religious figures in the UK". He was best known for his longstanding work with the media, most notably his wry and gentle sense of humour on Thought for the Day on BBC Radio 4's Today programme. He was the first British rabbi publicly to declare his homosexuality.

Career
Blue was born in the East End of London in 1930. His parents were Jews of Russian origin and his father worked as a tailor. Blue did not receive a religious education, declaring that he lost his religious faith at the age of five after a petitionary prayer failed to remove Adolf Hitler and Oswald Mosley. Instead, Blue became interested in Marxism. He entered Hendon County School at sixth form level, following education in the East End and a year out of school at age 16–17. He served in the British Army but was discharged after having a nervous breakdown brought on by anxiety over his closet homosexuality.

Blue read history at Balliol College, Oxford and Semitics at University College London. He regained his faith while at Oxford, when he found some resolution to severe personal conflicts regarding his sexual orientation at a Quaker meeting. He also found Victor Gollancz's A Year of Grace helpful during this time, and finally became one of the first two students at Leo Baeck College for training rabbis in 1956.

Blue was ordained as a rabbi in 1960. Between 1960 and 1963, Blue was the minister of the Settlement Synagogue and Middlesex New Synagogue. He then became the European Director of the World Union for Progressive Judaism. In 1967, he began a long-term engagement as a lecturer at Leo Baeck College in London. He lived in Finchley, north London.

Blue made his first radio broadcast in 1967 and was a regular contributor to BBC Radio 4's Thought for the Day programme for 25 years. He made numerous appearances on BBC Radio 4 and Radio 2, also producing a television programme entitled In Search of Holy England in 1989. In 1978, he collaborated with the author June Rose, on a cookbook, A Taste of Heaven: Adventures in Food & Faith. In 2006, a return trip to his childhood home in London's East End to mark the 350th anniversary of Jewish life in Britain was the subject of an evocative audioslideshow on the BBC News website.

Blue was awarded honorary doctorates from the Open University and Durham University. In 1994, he was appointed an Officer of the Order of the British Empire (OBE).

Personal life
Blue came out in 1980 while he was involved with sailboat designer Christopher "Kim" Holman, a relationship which lasted from 1962 to 1982. He published Godly and Gay in 1981.

After his split with Holman, Blue met Jim Cummings through a personal ad in Gay Times. They remained together until Cummings's death in 2014. He was involved with various gay charities, including the Jewish Gay and Lesbian Group, and Kairos in Soho.

Illnesses and death
Blue was diagnosed with epilepsy at the age of 57; however, he successfully controlled his disorder with medication. During an operation in 1997, a surgeon discovered a tumour which tests proved to be malignant. He received radiotherapy and hormonal treatment to reduce any further growth. He was also diagnosed as having Parkinson's disease. Blue died on 19 December 2016 at the age of 86.

Books
To Heaven with Scribes and Pharisees (Darton, Longman and Todd,1975) .
A Backdoor to Heaven (Fount, 1985) .
Kitchen Blues (ISIS Large Print, 1986) .
Bolts from the Blue (Hodder & Stoughton, 1986) .
Simply Divine - with Reverend John Eley (British Broadcasting Corporation, 1986) .
Bedside Manna (Victor Gollancz, 1991) .
Tales of Body and Soul (Coronet, 1995) .
My Affair with Christianity (Hodder & Stoughton General, 1999) .
Sun, Sand and Soul (Hodder & Stoughton General, 1999) .
Kindred Spirits (Fount, 1999) .
Hitchhiking to Heaven – Autobiography (Hodder & Stoughton General, 2004) .
Best of Blue (Continuum, 2006) .
The Godseeker's Guide (Continuum, 2010) .

References

External links
 BBC Norfolk interview with Louise Priest, 25 October 2007
 Sue Lawley's castaway is Rabbi Lionel Blue – Desert Island Discs, 4 August 1989
 Blue's own radio obituary of himself – BBC Radio 4, 20 December 2016

1930 births
2016 deaths
Alumni of Balliol College, Oxford
Alumni of Leo Baeck College
Alumni of University College London
British radio personalities
British Reform rabbis
Clergy from London
English Jews
English people of Russian-Jewish descent
British gay writers
British LGBT broadcasters
LGBT rabbis
English LGBT people
LGBT theologians
Officers of the Order of the British Empire
People educated at Hendon School
People with epilepsy
People with Parkinson's disease
People associated with the Open University
People associated with Durham University